Parliamentary elections were held in Andorra on 24 April 2005. The result was a victory for the Liberal Party of Andorra, which won 14 of the 28 seats. Its leader, Marc Forné Molné, remained Prime Minister. Voter turnout was 80.4%.

Results

References

External links
Official government election site

Andorra
2005 in Andorra
Parliamentary elections in Andorra
April 2005 events in Europe